The following radio stations broadcast on AM frequency 540 kHz: 540 AM is a Canadian and Mexican clear-channel frequency. CBK, Watrous-Regina, Saskatchewan, CBT Grand Falls-Windsor, Newfoundland and Labrador, and XEWA San Luis Potosí, Mexico, share Class A status on 540 kHz.

Argentina 
 LRA14 in Santa Fe, Santa Fe.
 LRA25 in Tartagal, Salta.
 LU17 in Puerto Madryn, Chubut.
 Radio Pasión in Buenos Aires.
 Presidente Perón in Buenos Aires.

Australia 
 4QL in Longreach, Queensland
 7SD in Scottsdale, Tasmania

Belgium 
 ORU Brussels

Brazil 
 ZYH295 in Manaus, Amazonas
 ZYH610 in Canindé, Ceará
 ZYH755 in Goiânia, Goiás
 ZYH894 in Barra do Corda, Maranhão
 ZYJ450 in Rio de Janeiro, Rio de Janeiro
 ZYJ778 in Rio do Sul, Santa Catarina
 ZYK226 in Canoas, Rio Grande do Sul
 ZYK322 in Santo Ângelo, Rio Grande do Sul
 ZYK734 in Sumaré, São Paulo
 ZYL331 in Ipanema, Minas Gerais
 ZYI914 in Água Branca, Piauí

Canada 
Stations in bold are clear-channel stations.

Chile 
 CB-054 Melipilla
 CD-054 Valdivia

China 
 CNR The Voice of China

Colombia 
 HJKA Bogotá

Costa Rica 
 TICAL Cartago

Dominican Republic 
 HICM Santo Domingo

Ecuador 
 HCFA2 Guayaquil

El Salvador 
 YSHV San Salvador
 YNOW Managua

Ethiopia 
 ETEBS Ghimbi

Finland 
 OFF Oulu

Grenada 
 ZBF-AM Morne Rouge

Guatemala 
 Radio Amistad  (call-sign unknown)  San Pedro La Laguna
 Radio Cobán (call-sign unknown) Cobán

Hungary 
 HAL-3 Solt

Indonesia 
 8FG200 Bandung
 PM5DXA Barabai
 PM8CNI Trimurjo

Iran 
 EPM-3 Mashhad

Japan 
 JOSK Kitakyushu
 JOSG Matsumoto
 JOMG Miyazaki
 JOJG Yamagata

Kuwait 
 9KV-1 Kabd

Mali 
 TZH Bamako

Mexico 
Stations in bold are clear-channel stations.
 XESURF-AM Tijuana, Baja California
 XEMIT-AM Comitán, Chiapas
 XETX-AM Nuevo Casas Grandes, Chihuahua
 XEWF-AM Tlalmanalco, State of Mexico
 XEHS-AM Los Mochis, Sinaloa
 XEWA-AM San Luis Potosí, San Luis Potosí - 150 kW, transmitter located at 
 XEWA-AM in Monterrey, Nuevo León

New Zealand 
 ZL1XC Tauranga/Papamoa
 ZL2XNR New Plymouth/Kaimata

Nicaragua 
 YNDW Managua

Pakistan 
 APP-1 Peshawar

Panama 
 HOPU Los Algarrobos / David, Chiriqui
 HOU 23 Los Algarrobos, Veraguas

Peru 
 OBX4E Lima
 OCX2D Trujillo

The Philippines 
 DZWT Baguio City – (Catholic Media Network)
 DYRB Cebu City – (Radio Corporation of the Philippines)
 DXGH General Santos – (Manila Broadcasting Company)
 DYDW Tacloban City – (Word Broadcasting Corporation & Catholic Media Network)

Russian Federation 
 RW388 Orenburg

Samoa 
 5W2AP Apia

South Korea 
 HLCZ-AM Hongsong
 HLSC-AM Jumchon
 HLSN-AM Changsu

Spain 
 EAJ15 Barcelona

Taiwan 
 CNR The Voice of China in Lianjiang County (transferred from China)

Thailand 
 HSAT-AM Bangkok

United States

Puerto Rico 
 ACE Roosevelt Roads Naval Station, Puerto Rico

Venezuela 
 YVUR San Juan de Manapiare
 YVOV La Villa del Rosario

External links

 FCC list of radio stations on 540 kHz
 Radio 7SD 540 AM Scottsdale Australia

References

Lists of radio stations by frequency